is a Japanese voice actress affiliated with Arts Vision. She is known primarily for her performances in anime; some of her leading roles include Nozomi Kaminashi in Keijo!!!!!!!!, Fuuka Akitsuki in Fuuka, Ayano Yugiri in Engage Kiss, and Miorine Rembran in Mobile Suit Gundam: The Witch from Mercury.

Biography
Lynn was born in Yokosuka, Kanagawa, she is of mixed American and Japanese parentage. She became interested in acting while at nursery school. She had learned that her mother used to be part of bands, which influenced her interest in entertainment. Lynn watched Case Closed and InuYasha, while in elementary school. She later attended the school, after asking permission with her parents. She worked at the institute in her first year of high school; as she lived in Niigata Prefecture at that time, she would take the Shinkansen to Tokyo every Sunday for lessons. While attending high school, she became a manager of the school's basketball club. In her third year, she performed at the school's cultural festival; the positive reception she received for her performance inspired her to continue her pursuit. She continued her studies at the training school, while starting her voice acting roles. She initially voiced roles in Japanese dubs of foreign media, while voicing background characters in anime. After passing an audition, her first main role is Maya Kyōdō in the anime series Sabagebu!. She played Lisesharte Atismata in Undefeated Bahamut Chronicle, Mashiro Munetani in High School Fleet and Nozomi Kaminashi in Keijo. She played Fuuka Akitsuki in Fuuka and performed insert songs for the series. Lynn played Himari Takanashi in Interviews with Monster Girls, Mizuki Fudō in Idol Incidents, Mano Rinoda in Schoolgirl Strikers and Ena Komiya in Just Because!. She played Song Minhua in Girly Air Force and Mafuyu Kirisu in We Never Learn. She enjoys horse racing and won the 99th Prix de l'Arc de Triomphe at Longchamp Racecourse in Paris, France on October 4, 2020 with a trifecta ticket of odds of 1010.8 times and the 65th Osaka Cup at Hanshin Racecourse on April 4, 2021 with a trifecta ticket of odds of 1062.1 times and popularity of 174. On April 4, 2021, she won the 65th Osaka Cup at Hanshin Racecourse by winning a trifecta ticket with odds of 1,062.1, the most popular horse in the race, for a payout of over one million yen.

On July 29, 2022, during Lynn's appearance on the live-streaming program for Engage Kiss, it was discovered that she was positive for COVID-19 after the PCR test she had taken a few days earlier revealed the result, forcing her to leave in the middle of the program.

Filmography

Anime series

Original video animation

Original net animation (ONA)

Anime films

Drama CDs
 Sukina Hito Hodo, Mugita
 Sennen Sensou Aigis Gekka no Hanayome, Katy
 The Ancient Magus' Bride, Fairy

Movie Comics
  Boku no Hatsukoi o Kimi ni Sasagu, Mayu Taneda

Video games

Dubbing

Live-action
Love, Rosie (Bethany Williams (Suki Waterhouse))
Teen Beach Movie (Struts (Jessica Lee Keller))
iCarly (Marcia, Monee)
Animation
Video-game
Life Is Strange (Chloe Price) -->

Discography

Unit Member
Gesukawa☆Girls

Momoka Sonokawa (Ayaka Ōhashi), Miou Ootori (Yumi Uchiyama), Urara Kasugano (Rumi Ōkubo), Maya Kyōdo (Lynn), Kayo Gōtokuji (Nao Toyama)

SMILE X

Natsuki Hoshina (Sarara Yashima), Shizuka Onimaru (Mai Fuchigami), Sachie Kondo (Reina Ueda), Mizuki Fudō (Lynn), Sakurako Īzuka (Yurika Kubo), Ume Momoi (Sayaka Nakaya)

References

External links
 Official agency profile 
 
 

Year of birth missing (living people)
Living people
Arts Vision voice actors
Japanese people of American descent
Japanese video game actresses
Japanese voice actresses
Voice actresses from Niigata Prefecture
21st-century Japanese actresses